Haystack Rock may refer to:

Sea stacks in Oregon:
 Haystack Rock in Clatsop County
 Haystack Rock (Tillamook County, Oregon)